Lists of U-boats cover U-boats, military submarines operated by Germany, particularly in the First and Second World Wars.
 List of German U-boats
 List of U-boat types of Germany
 List of U-boat flotillas of Germany
 List of U-boats never deployed of World War II Germany
 Uncompleted U-boat projects of World War II Germany
 List of most successful German U-boats of Germany for kill tonnage in World War I and World War II
 Foreign U-boats of World War II Germany
 List of Austro-Hungarian U-boats

See also
 List of U-boat regions of Germany during World War II

Lists of submarines
German military-related lists
.U-boats list